Kirstein is a German surname. Notable people with the surname include:

 Georg Heinrich Kirstein (1858–1921), German Roman-catholic bishop in Mainz
 Lincoln Kirstein (1907–1996), American writer, impresario, art connoisseur and cultural figure
 Louis E. Kirstein (1867–1942), American businessman and philanthropist.
 Peter Kirstein
 Peter T. Kirstein (1933–2020), British computer scientist
 Petrus Kirstenius, (1577–1640) German physician and orientalist
Roland Kirstein (born 1965), German economist
Rosemary Kirstein, American writer

See also
Kirstein Building
 

German-language surnames

de:Kirstein